Roman Krzyżelewski (born January 25, 1949 in Rzeczenica, Poland) was the  commander-in-chief of the Polish Navy between October 2003 and November 2007. For most of his career he was a Submarine Officer, although he started his career as a Weapons Conscript on board an Osa-class missile boat

Honours and awards
Commander's Cross of the Order of Polonia Restituta (previously awarded the Officer's Cross and the Knight's Cross)
Silver Cross of Merit
Gold Medal of the Armed Forces in the Service of the Fatherland (Medal Siły Zbrojne w Służbie Ojczyzny)
Silver Medal of Merit for National Defence
Medal Milito Pro Christo
Commander of the Legion of Merit (USA)
Haller Ring

References

External links

1949 births
Living people
People from Człuchów County
Polish Navy admirals
Knights of the Order of Polonia Restituta
Commanders of the Order of Polonia Restituta
Officers of the Order of Polonia Restituta
Recipients of the Silver Cross of Merit (Poland)
Commanders of the Legion of Merit